Howdenshire was a county constituency in Yorkshire which returned one Member of Parliament (MP) to the House of Commons of the Parliament of the United Kingdom, elected by the first past the post voting system.

It was created for the 1885 general election, and abolished for the 1950 general election.

Boundaries 
1885–1918: The Sessional Divisions of Holme Beacon, Howdenshire, South Hunsley Beacon, Wilton Beacon, and Ouse and Derwent (except the part included in the extended Municipal Borough of York).

1918–1950: The Urban Districts of Hessle and Pocklington, the Rural Districts of Escrick, Howden, Pocklington, and Riccall, in the Rural District of Beverley the civil parishes of Brantingham, Ellerker, Elloughton with Brough, and South Cave, and part of the Rural District of Sculcoates.

Members of Parliament

Election results

Elections in the 1880s

Elections in the 1890s

Elections in the 1900s

Elections in the 1910s 

General Election 1914–15:

Another General Election was required to take place before the end of 1915. The political parties had been making preparations for an election to take place and by the July 1914, the following candidates had been selected; 
Unionist: Henry Harrison-Broadley
Liberal: Thomas Fenby

Elections in the 1920s

Elections in the 1930s

Elections in the 1940s 
General Election 1939–40:
Another General Election was required to take place before the end of 1940. The political parties had been making preparations for an election to take place from 1939 and by the end of this year, the following candidates had been selected; 
Conservative: Clifford Glossop

References

Sources 

Parliamentary constituencies of the East Riding of Yorkshire (defunct)
Constituencies of the Parliament of the United Kingdom established in 1885
Constituencies of the Parliament of the United Kingdom disestablished in 1950